In 1859, during the Italian Risorgimento – the Second Italian War of Independence, – there was another greater battle here, more commonly called the Battle of Solferino or the Battle of Solferino and San Martino (it was that portion of the struggle, which was fought out between Benedek (Austrian 8th Corps, on the right flank) and the Piedmontese army, that is sometimes called the battle of San Martino - Benedek's corps held its own all day and covered the retreat of the defeated Austrian army, at the end of the action). Solferino was the largest battle since that at Leipzig in 1813. As a result of their defeat, the Austrians lost their grip on the region.
The village of San Martino was renamed San Martino della Battaglia and a tower, museum and ossuary have been erected as a monument to the battle and its fallen.
The site is a few kilometres to the South of Lago di Garda.
Nowadays the village is a frazione (hamlet) of the comune of Desenzano del Garda (province of Brescia).

Businessman Henri Dunant was so affected by the plight of the wounded in the aftermath, that he embarked on a path that led to the formation of the Red Cross and the writing of the Geneva Convention. Each year, San Martino holds a festival to remember this battle.

See also

Battle of Solferino, where a fuller account of the 1859 action can be read.

External links
Battle of San Martino 1482
The Red Cross and the Battle of Solferino

San Martino
Solferino 1859
Solferino 1859
Solferino 1859
1859 in Italy
1859 in the Austrian Empire
1859 in France
San Martino
June 1859 events
San Martino